This is a list of Ambassadors born in or representing Ireland.

An ambassador is an official envoy, especially a highest ranking diplomat who represents a state and is usually accredited to state, or to an international organization as the representative of their own government or sovereign or appointed for a special and often temporary diplomatic assignment

Ambassadors

 Anne Anderson
 Anne Barrington
 Ray Bassett
 Frederick Boland
  Niall Burgess
 Geraldine Byrne Nason
 Charles Bewley
 Daniel Binchy
  William Carlos (Philippines)
  Frances Collins
  Michael Collins
 David J. Cooney
  Gerard Corr
 Con Cremin
 Bernard Davenport
 Denis Devlin
 David Donoghue
 Noel Dorr
 John Whelan Dulanty
  Sean Farrell
  Frank Flood
  Eimear Friel
 Derek Hannon
  Justin Harman
 Mahon Hayes
 John Hearne
 Timothy Joseph Horan (Spain, Sweden)
 Sean Hoy
 Valentin Iremonger
 Alison Kelly
 Declan Kelly
  Kevin Kelly
 Leopold H. Kerney
  Thomas Joseph Kiernan
 Seán Lester
 Emma Madigan
 Bob McDonagh
 Bobby McDonagh
 Philip McDonagh
  Brian McElduff
 Eamonn McKee
 Pádraig MacKernan
 Josephine McNeill
 Michael MacWhite
 Daniel Mulhall
 Pádraig Murphy
 John Neary (diplomat)
 Bill Nolan (diplomat)
 Patricia O'Brien
 Dáithí O'Ceallaigh
  Colm Ó Floinn
  Orla O'Hanrahan
 James O'Mara
  Breffni O’Reilly (Switzerland)
 Sean G. Ronan
 Richard Ryan
 James A. Sharkey
  Geraldine Skinner
  Joseph Small
 Mary Catherine Tinney (Sweden, Belgium, Kenya)
 Joseph Walshe
 Patrick Walsh
 Mary Whelan
  Colin Wrafter

Ambassadors
Ireland
List
Ambassadors